Haunting on Fraternity Row is a 2018 American supernatural horror film directed by Brant Sersen and written by Jeff Cahn and Sersen. The film stars Jacob Artist, Jayson Blair and Shanley Caswell.

Plot
A fraternity house throws their final party of the year, a massive Luau extravaganza, but when fraternity brothers and co-eds begin dying horrible deaths they discover an evil entity has taken over the house.

Cast
 Jacob Artist as Jason  
 Jayson Blair as Tanner  
 Shanley Caswell as Claire  
 Claudia Lee as Liza
 Ashton Moio as Dougie  
 Cameron Moulène as Grant 
 Molly Tarlov as Maggie 
 Chester Rushing as Drew  
 Breon Pugh as Wiggles  
 Eduardo Losan as Lube
 Stephanie Honoré as Daphne  
 Melissa Saint-Amand as Kate  
 Mary Alice Risener as Ali 
 Ashton Leigh as Sadie
 Ran Yatim as Demon

Release 
According to the Movie and Television Review and Classification Board of the Philippines (MTRCB), the horrific scenes, blood and gore, the rain of the "F" word like there's no tomorrow, blatant drug use, two women kissing each other just to titillate push the classification to "for adults only." The MTRCB classified the film as rated R-18.

References

External links
 
 

2018 films
2018 horror films
2010s ghost films
2010s supernatural horror films
2010s teen horror films
American ghost films
American supernatural horror films
American teen horror films
Camcorder films
Films about fraternities and sororities
Films scored by John Swihart
Found footage films
Paranormal films
2010s English-language films
2010s American films